Woodley railway station serves the suburb of Woodley in Stockport, Greater Manchester, England. It is situated where the A560 road from Stockport to Gee Cross, near Hyde, crosses over the railway line.

History
The station was opened on 5 August 1862 by the Manchester, Sheffield and Lincolnshire Railway; it became a junction later when a line from Stockport Tiviot Dale, the Stockport and Woodley Junction Railway, reached the suburb in 1865.  The station subsequently became jointly owned and operated by the MS&L, Great Northern Railway and Midland Railway, as part of the Cheshire Lines Committee system.

The Stockport route closed to passengers in January 1967, although a short section at the eastern end remains in use today for goods traffic, serving a Tarmac stone terminal and waste recycling plant at Bredbury.

From 1866, a second link from Apethorne Junction to the north gave an east-facing link to the Woodhead Line, at Godley Junction; it was used heavily for many years by trans-Pennine freight traffic, mainly coal from the South Yorkshire coalfields to Fiddlers Ferry power station. This link was closed in 1982, soon after the Woodhead route itself, and is now a shared-use path.

Services

On Mondays to Saturdays, there is generally a half-hourly stopping service northbound to Manchester Piccadilly and southbound to Rose Hill Marple; the service is more limited in the evenings.

There is no Sunday service. A normal service operates on bank holidays.

In July 2020, Northern informed local residents that services between Manchester and Rose Hill Marple would not operate between early-September and mid-December 2020; this was due to the train operating company's staff shortages from the effects of the COVID-19 pandemic.  This left Rose Hill Marple, Hyde North and Hyde Central, as well as Woodley, without a train service for around four months. Regular services have been restored since.

Railway Clearing House map of the Woodley area

The railway line from Hyde through Woodley to Romiley and Marple is shown as being owned by the Great Central and Midland Railways joint committee. The line from Stockport (Tiviot Dale) through Woodley is shown to be owned by the Cheshire Lines Committee.

Notes

References

 Marshall, J (1981) Forgotten Railways North-West England, David & Charles (Publishers) Ltd, Newton Abbott.

External links

Railway stations in the Metropolitan Borough of Stockport
DfT Category F2 stations
Former Great Central and Midland Joint Railway stations
Northern franchise railway stations
1862 establishments in England